This article is the discography of New Zealand singer John Rowles.

Albums

Studio albums

Live albums

Compilation albums

Singles

Notes

References

Discographies of New Zealand artists
Pop music discographies